Sargocentron hormion is a species of Squirrelfish belonging to the genus of Sargocentron. It is reported to have been found in Pitcairn, the Cook Islands and French Polynesia. It inhabits rocky bottoms and coral reefs.

References

hormion
Fish of the Pacific Ocean
Taxa named by John Ernest Randall